Name of the Year is a prize awarded by one of Norway's biggest newspapers, Verdens Gang (VG). Instituted in 1974, the prize has been awarded to several persons, including King Olav V in 1975.

Winners 
 1974: Jens Evensen 
 1975: King Olav
 1976: Kjell Thorsen – captain of the ship «Sørlandet»
 1977: Thor Heyerdahl
 1978: Olav Hodne
 1979: Ingolf Stangeland
 1980: Svein Inge Jacobsen
 1981: Svanhild Rolfsen
 1982: Berit Aunli
 1983: Grete Waitz
 1984: Steinar Øvervold
 1985: A-ha
 1986: Norway women's national handball team
 1987: Edvin Rindal
 1988: Kai Zahl
 1989: Frelsesarmeen
 1990: Per Hovda
 1991: Odd Kåre Rabben
 1992: Ola Thune
 1993: Janikke Hundvedbakken
 1994: Johann Olav Koss
 1995: Anne Kristine Herje
 1996: Anne Grosvold
 1997: Nils Arne Eggen 
 1998: Egil «Drillo» Olsen
 1999: Einar Eikeland 
 2000: Kadra Yusuf 
 2001: Arne Rinnan
 2002: Robert Stoltenberg 
 2003: Petter Solberg  
 2004: Stein Magne Lian 
 2005: Heia Tufte 
 2006: Jan Egeland
 2007: Tor Arne Lau-Henriksen 
 2008: Marit Breivik
 2009: Magnus Carlsen 
 2010: Thor Hushovd
 2011: The volunteers at Utøya
 2012: Geir Lippestad 
 2013: Magnus Carlsen
 2014: Mads Gilbert
 2015: Robin Schaefer 
 2016: The heroes of the Mediterranean - The Norwegian contribution to the relief effort during the European migrant crisis
 2017: King Harald
 2018: Else Kåss Furuseth

References

External links 

 Årets navn

Norwegian awards